Clinical Orthopaedics and Related Research is a peer-reviewed medical journal. It was established in 1953 as Clinical Orthopaedics by the Association of Bone and Joint Surgeons as an alternative to the Journal of Bone and Joint Surgery, which was the only American orthopaedic journal at the time. The journal obtained its current title in 1963 and its mission is to disseminate knowledge about all aspects of musculoskeletal research, diagnoses, and treatment.

In conjunction with Clinical Orthopaedics and Related Research, the Association of Bone and Joint Surgeons presents three awards annually including the Nicolas Andry Award.

References

External links 
 

Publications established in 1953
Springer Science+Business Media academic journals
Orthopedics journals
English-language journals
Monthly journals